Pager Publications, Inc. is a 501(c)(3) nonprofit literary organization that curates and supports peer-edited publications for the medical education community.

Pager Publications, Inc. was founded on July 21, 2014 in the State of Indiana as a nonprofit literary corporation by Ajay Major, Aleena Paul, and Erica Fugger. The corporation received its IRS 501(c)(3) nonprofit designation on January 29, 2015.

Mission 
The mission statement of Pager Publications, Inc. is as follows: "We strive to provide students and educators with dedicated spaces for the free expression of their distinctive voices."

Publications 
Pager Publications, Inc. currently provides financial and administrative support to the following publications:

 in-Training, the online peer-reviewed publication for medical students, at in-training.org
 in-House, the online peer-reviewed publication for residents & fellows, at in-housestaff.org
 The Palate, the online peer-reviewed publication for medical students at the intersection of nutrition and public health, at thepalate.org
North Wing Magazine, the online magazine for student doctors originally founded in 1935 in Sheffield, UK, at northwingmagazine.org
Mosaic in Medicine, the online peer-reviewed publication for underrepresented voices in medicine, at mosaicinmedicine.org
Intervene Upstream, the online peer-reviewed public health publication for graduate students, at interveneupstream.org

Books 
Pager Publications, Inc. also functions as a publishing house and has published the following books:

 in-Training: Stories from Tomorrow's Physicians
Family Doc Diary: A Resident Physician's Reflections in Fifty-Two Entries
in-Training: Stories from Tomorrow's Physicians, Volume 2
Salve: Words For The Journey

References 

501(c)(3) organizations
Non-profit publishers
Online nonprofit organizations